FVG may refer to:
 Faculty for Comparative Religion, in Belgium
 Ferrovías Guatemala, a Guatemalan rail operator
 Free-minded Union, a German political party in 1893–1910 (FVg)
 Friuli-Venezia Giulia, a region of Italy
 VG Airlines, a defunct Belgian airline